Charles Dickens' Birthplace Museum is a writer's house museum in Landport, Portsmouth, England situated at the birthplace of the eminent English author Charles Dickens; and as such played a prominent part in the 2012 bicentennial celebrations. It is one of six museums run by Portsmouth Museums, part of Portsmouth City Council.

See also
Dickens family
Dickens World
Charles Dickens Museum, London
Tavistock House

References

External links
Official website

Dickens
Grade I listed houses
Grade I listed museum buildings
Museums established in 1953
1805 establishments in England
Museums in Portsmouth
Literary museums in England
Biographical museums in Hampshire
Historic house museums in Hampshire
Dickens, Charles